Andriy Danylov, (Ukrainian: Андрій Данилов), is a paralympic athlete from Ukraine competing mainly in category T42 sprint events.

Andriy first competed in the Paralympics in 1996 chere he competed in the 100m, 200m and long jump.  For both the 2000 and 2004 Summer Paralympics he competed in just the 100m and 200m winning bronze in both in 2000.

References

Paralympic athletes of Ukraine
Athletes (track and field) at the 1996 Summer Paralympics
Athletes (track and field) at the 2000 Summer Paralympics
Athletes (track and field) at the 2004 Summer Paralympics
Paralympic bronze medalists for Ukraine
Ukrainian male sprinters
Ukrainian male long jumpers
Living people
Medalists at the 2000 Summer Paralympics
Year of birth missing (living people)
Paralympic medalists in athletics (track and field)
Sprinters with limb difference
Long jumpers with limb difference
Paralympic sprinters
Paralympic long jumpers